The 2002 Rhode Island Rams football team was an American football team that represented the University of Rhode Island in the Atlantic 10 Conference during the 2002 NCAA Division I-AA football season. In their third season under head coach Tim Stowers, the Rams compiled a 3–9 record (1–8 against conference opponents) and finished last out of eleven teams in the conference.

Schedule

References

Rhode Island
Rhode Island Rams football seasons
Rhode Island Rams football